Nymphargus mariae, commonly known as Maria's giant glass frog, is a species of frog in the family Centrolenidae.
It is found in the cloud forests of the Serranía de Sira, Huánuco, Peru and in Ecuador. A population endemic to Ecuador was previously considered to be a distinct species, Nymphargus puyoensis, but is now classified as a junior synonym.

Its natural habitats are the cloud forests of the Serranía de Sira and lower montane wet forests of Ecuador. The larvae develop in streams. There is some habitat loss occurring within the already limited range (<5,000 km2) of this species.

References

mariae
Amphibians of Ecuador
Amphibians of Peru
Taxonomy articles created by Polbot
Amphibians described in 1979